The  Chicago Bruisers season was the first season for the arena football franchise. The Bruisers took a chance with a young team that averaged 25 years of age. The Bruisers' lost their first game in franchise history, 44–52 in overtime, to the Denver Dynamite. The Bruisers struggled in their second game, giving up 45 points in the first half before losing 23–60 to the Pittsburgh Gladiators. Despite getting off to a 2–3 start, the Bruisers had an opportunity to make it to ArenaBowl I with a win in the final week of the season against the Dynamite. The Bruisers however would lose 35–52. They finished with a record of 2–4 and failed to qualify for the playoffs.

Schedule

Standings

y – clinched regular-season title

x – clinched playoff spot

Roster

Stats

Offense

Passing

Rushing

Receiving

Defense

Special teams

Kick return

Kicking

Awards

References

Chicago Bruisers
Chicago Bruisers seasons
Chicago Bruisers